Max Petitpierre (26 February 1899 – 25 March 1994) was a Swiss politician, jurist and member of the Swiss Federal Council, heading the Political Department (Ministry of Foreign Affairs) (1944-1961).

He was elected to the Swiss Federal Council on 14 December 1944 and handed over office on 30 June 1961. He was affiliated to the Free Democratic Party.

He served as President of the Diplomatic Conference at Geneva of 1949 which adopted the landmark 1949 Geneva Conventions.

During his time in office he held the Political Department (Ministry of Foreign Affairs) and was President of the Confederation three times in 1950, 1955 and 1960.

He died at the age of 95.

External links
 
Fonds Max Petitpierre. Summary of his papers archived at Centre d'archives européennes, Coppet.

 

1899 births
1994 deaths
People from Neuchâtel
Swiss Calvinist and Reformed Christians
Free Democratic Party of Switzerland politicians
Members of the Federal Council (Switzerland)
Members of the Council of States (Switzerland)
University of Neuchâtel alumni
Foreign ministers of Switzerland